Peder Benzon (26 July 1684 – after 13 May 1735) was a Danish landowner and Supreme Court justice. He was the owner of seven manors on Zealand at the  time of his death in 1735.

Early life
Bentzon was born in Copenhagen, the son of Danish Chancellery secretary Niels Benzon and Else Pedersdatter Scavenius. He was the brother of Jacob Benzon and Lars Benzon. He attended the Knight's Academy from 1699.

Career
Benzon was appointed as judge first at the Hofretten in 1710 and as Supreme Court Justice from 1712. He was dismissed from the Supreme Court on 13 May 11735.

Property
Bentzon purchased Hagestedgaard in 1711. He acquired Gjeddesdal from his brother Lars Benzon in 1714 and sold Hagestedgaard to him the following year. He acquired Tryggevælde and Alslevgård in 1716 but ceded the estates to King Frederick IV in exchange for Vibygård in 1718. He acquired Aggersvold from his brother Jacob Benzon in 1720 but ceded it to Lars Benzon in 1723.

He was also the founder of a number of new manors. He founded Benzonseje (now Risbyholm) in 1721 and the manors of  Benzonslund (now Dønnerup),  Benzonsdal and Gislingegård  in 1730.

Personal life
Bentzon married Anne Sophie Wissing (1692-1762) in 1709. He was the father of military officer and landowner, Christian Benzon (1718–1801).

References

Danish judges
18th-century Danish landowners
1684 births
1735 deaths
Benzon  family